Andrei Sergeyevich Fyodorovskiy (born December 7, 1963) is a Russian professional football coach and a former player. He made his professional debut in the Soviet Second League in 1981 for FC Dynamo Makhachkala.

Honours
 USSR Federation Cup finalist: 1988.

References

Soviet footballers
FC Rotor Volgograd players
Russian football managers
1963 births
Living people
Association football defenders
FC Dynamo Moscow reserves players
Neftçi PFK players
FC Dynamo Makhachkala players
Soviet Top League players